FVWM95 is a window manager for the X Window System based on the popular FVWM 2 window manager.  It is similar to the original FVWM, but is designed to closely resemble the look of Windows 95.

FVWM95 was for a while a rather popular window manager; for example, Red Hat Linux 5.0 used it as the default.  It is no longer as popular, nor is it well-maintained or included in modern Linux distributions. FVWM98 is a derivative of FVWM95 that is designed to look like Windows 98 instead of Windows 95.

FVWM95 was included in Debian since 2000 but was removed in 2006 because of incompatibility with the UTF-8 character encoding system.

Similar window managers include Qvwm, IceWM and JWM.

Features 

 Windows 95-like appearance.
 Taskbar for quick window switching.
 Virtual desktop support.
 Most features from FVWM 2 (may not include absolute latest bleeding-edge capabilities).

See also 

 IceWM
 Comparison of X window managers

References

External links 

 
 Debugged fork of FVWM95 2.0.43f, rev. 2017-04

Free X window managers